"Wax Ecstatic (To Sell Angelina)" is a song by American rock band Sponge, released in 1996 as the first single from their second album Wax Ecstatic.

Release and reception
It is the band's third song to appear on the U.S. Billboard Hot 100 singles chart, having peaked at number 64. It is the band's third highest-charting song on the Modern Rock Tracks chart, where it reached number 15. The song also reached number 11 on the Mainstream Rock Tracks chart.

Music video

The music video for "Wax Ecstatic" was released in 1996 and was directed by George Vale. It revolves around a roller derby girl (Angelina, or "Angel", per her nickname) and her aspirations to better herself in the sport.  She purchases "Wax Ecstatic" pills (a gold-colored gelatin capsule) and starts taking them. Footage is shown of 1990s-era roller derby, along with footage of the band performing, and lead singer Vinnie Dombroski promoting and selling the Wax Ecstatic pills. Towards the end of the video, Angelina is shown playing in a bout. She gets mixed up in a collision and falls to the ground. The gold-colored liquid that comprised the Wax Ecstatic pills starts dripping from her mouth onto the floor, which seems to prove that they were not the answer that she was looking for.

Track listings

All songs produced by Tim Patalan and Sponge except where noted.

Charts

Use in pop culture
The song is featured in the 2012 French film Dead Shadows.

Personnel
 Vinnie Dombroski – lead vocals
 Joey Mazzola – guitar, backing vocals
 Mike Cross – guitar
 Tim Cross – bass
 Charlie Grover – drums

References

1996 singles
Sponge (band) songs
1996 songs
Columbia Records singles